The Duchy of Bohemia was established in 870 and raised to the Kingdom of Bohemia in 1198. Several Bohemian monarchs ruled as non-hereditary kings beforehand, first gaining the title in 1085. From 1004 to 1806, Bohemia was part of the Holy Roman Empire, and its ruler was an elector. During 1526–1804 the Kingdom of Bohemia, together with the other lands of the Bohemian Crown, was ruled under a personal union as part of the Habsburg monarchy. From 1804 to 1918, Bohemia was part of the Austrian Empire, which itself was part of the dual monarchy of Austria-Hungary from 1867 to 1918. Following the dissolution of the monarchy, the Bohemian lands, now also referred to as Czech lands, became part of Czechoslovakia, and they have formed today's Czech Republic since 1993.

Legendary rulers of Bohemia
 praotec Čech (Pater Boemus)
 Lech
 Krok
 Libuše, duchess
 Přemysl the Ploughman, her husband
 Nezamysl
 Mnata
 Vojen
 Vnislav
 Křesomysl
 Neklan
 Hostivít

Princes of Great Moravia

 Mojmír I (c. 830–846)
 Rastislav (846–870)
 Svatopluk (871)
 William and Engelschalk (871)
 Slavomír (871)
 Svatopluk (871–894)
 Mojmír II (894–906?)

Dukes of Bohemia (c. 870–1198)

Kings of Bohemia (1085–1092, 1158–1172, 1198–1918)

See also
 
 
 List of rulers of Czechs
 List of Bohemian consorts
 
 Coronation of the Bohemian monarch
 Bohemian crown jewels

 01
Bohemia
Bohemia, Rulers